Happy New Year is the eighth studio album by alternative rock band Oneida. It was released in 2006 through Jagjaguwar.

Track listing
 "Distress"  – 3:21
 "Happy New Year"  – 2:33
 "The Adversary"  – 5:15
 "Up With People"  – 7:49
 "Pointing Fingers"  – 2:06
 "History's Great Navigators"  – 4:28
 "Busy Little Bee"  – 2:59
 "Reckoning"  – 2:52
 "You Can Never Tell"  – 2:28
 "The Misfit"  – 3:16
 "Thank Your Parents"  – 7:00

References

2006 albums